"Real Gangstaz" is the second single from Mobb Deep's Amerikaz Nightmare album, and is produced by and features Lil Jon. The video is a sequel to "Got It Twisted", the first single from the album.

Track listing
Side A
"Real Gangstaz" [Dirty Version]
"Real Gangstaz" [Instrumental]

Side B
"Real Gangstaz" [Clean Version]
"Real Gangstaz" [Acappella]

Charts

Release history

References

2004 singles
Mobb Deep songs
Song recordings produced by Lil Jon
2004 songs
Songs written by Lil Jon
Jive Records singles
Songs written by Prodigy (rapper)
Songs written by Havoc (musician)
Gangsta rap songs
Crunk songs